The Elbit Systems Hermes 90 is an unmanned aerial vehicle (UAV) designed for tactical short-range missions using a heavy-fuel motor.

Jane's claims that the Hermes 90 has its roots in the IAI I-View and later in the BAE Skylynx II. Ownership of rights were subsequently moved to Elbit Systems.

The Hermes 90 has an operating range of about 15 hours and 100 km.

In September 2009, the Hermes 90 made its maiden flight.

Specifications

References

External links 

Elbit unmanned aerial vehicles
2000s Israeli military reconnaissance aircraft
V-tail aircraft